Wino (stylized as WINO and pronounced "wine-oh") is a Japanese rock band that formed in 1995 and broke up in 2002. Originally, the band's name was ボグ・マイトルスター (bogu maitorusuta), which seems to be just gibberish. The band was renamed WINO in 1996. One of Wino's biggest hits was "Taiyou wa Yoru mo Kagayaku" (The Sun Also Shines at Night), the second opening in the 1999 anime series Hunter × Hunter.

Style and influences

Their music was heavily influenced by British rock bands, most notably the Beatles, and the band has often been compared to Oasis.

Members
 Jun Yoshimura - lead vocals
 Naoyuki Hisanaga - lead guitar
 Shinichiro Togawa - rhythm guitar
 Hiroyuki Kawazoe - bass
 Masataka Kauma - drums

Discography

Albums
 Useless Music (1999)
Devil's Own
Inhaler
Wild Flower
Can't Leave the Here
Sister's High
White Room
Confusion
She
Call the Sun
Loaded
Unfinished Vibes

 Wino (1999)
The Action
Tomorrow
Velvet
Hospital
Glory
Freaks
Mirror
We Are the boys
Thank You
Anyhow
Friend of Mine
Ain't Gonna Lose

 Dirge No.9 (2001)
New Dawn F
Resolution
Mad Silence
Hurt
"Taiyou Wa Yoru Mo Kagayaku"
Butterfly
Empty Soul
Imagine, Still
My Life
Sullen Days (album version)
Dirge No.9

 Everlast (2002)
Warsaw
Everlast
Love Is Here
Jesus
All About a Boy
Philadelphia
Chelsea Girl
Forever Young
Not Alone
Freedom Song
Go Straight Song!

 Lion (2003)
New Song
Watermark: Ver.3
Thunder
Ride On
Sea Castle
Teenage Tears
Spin
Songs of Shadow
Talk to Me
Rainbow
A New World
Lost Communication
Little Saviour
Come Together Now
No Enemies
Break Down the Long Road, Break Down the Wall
Freedom Song

Singles
 "Devil's Own [Mix No.4]" (1998)
 "Loaded" (1998)
 "Ain't Gonna Lose" (1999)
 "Tomorrow" (1999)
 "The Action (All Really Want to Do)" (2000)
 "Sullen Days" (2000)
 "Taiyou wa Yoru mo Kagayaku" (2000)
 "New Dawn F" (2001)
 "Go Straight Song!" (2001)
 "Not Alone" (2002)
 "Love Is Here" (2002)

Compilations
 The Best of Wino - Volume 1 (2003)
The Action (All I Really Want to Do)
Everlast
Thank You
Wild Flower
Tomorrow
My Life
Dirge No.9
Loaded
Inhaler
Warsaw
New Dawn F
Go Straight Song!
Taiyou wa Yoru mo Kagayaku
Going Out
Devil's Own (Mix No.4)
Friend of Mine

DVD
 Lion (2003)
-opening-
The Action
White Room
-movie-
Velvet
-movie-
Devil's Own
-movie-
Watermark
-movie-
Taiyou wa Yoru mo Kagayaku
Everlasat
-movie-
Inhaler (performed at Akasaka Blitz on 14 March 2000)
New Dawn F
Love Is Here
-movie-
Go Straight Song! (performed at Shinjuku Liquid Room on 22 November 2002)
-ending-

Compilation appearances
 "Escape" and "Going Out" in Return of Guitar Lightning Horror Smilin''' (1996, Gods Pop Records)
 "Not Alone" in Football Music Album Yell (2006, Speedstar Records)
 "Thank you" in Thank You!! (2006, Speedstar Records)
 "Taiyou Wa Yoru Mo Kagayaku" in Hunter × Hunter Single Collection'' (2006, Miya Records)

References

External links
 Speedstar Records | Wino 
 HMV Japan - Wino 

Japanese hard rock musical groups
Japanese alternative rock groups
Japanese psychedelic rock music groups
Musical groups established in 1995
Musical groups disestablished in 2002
Musical groups from Tokyo